The first large peat-fired thermal power station in Russia was built on a location about 80 km away from Moscow, in the place of the current city of Elektrogorsk, during 1912-1914. It was called Elektroperedacha (literally "electric power transmission"), and the settlement around the station (future Elektrogorsk) acquired this name, Elektroperedacha, as well. Today the station is called GRES-3 or Elektrogorskaya GRES.

Terminology
The abbreviations below are commonly used in the names of power stations.

The term GRES refers to a condenser type electricity-only thermal power station introduced in the Soviet Union which still exist in Russia and other former Soviet republics.  The Russian abbreviation ГРЭС stands for Государственная районная электростанция, or "state-owned district power plant" (often abbreviated in English as SDPP). Over time the abbreviation has lost its literal meaning, and the term refers to a high-power (thousands of megawatt) thermal power station of condenser type.

The term TEC or TETs refers to combined heat and power plants.

History
The Soviet GOELRO plan of 1920s provided for construction of several GRES (along with 20 TEC and 10 hydroelectrostations, the best known among them is Shatura Power Station (peat-fired,  planned already in 1914).

The first GRES were constructed upon the initiative of power engineer Robert Klasson.

References

Fossil fuel power stations in Russia
Power stations built in the Soviet Union
Science and technology in the Soviet Union